Rafael Álvarez Serrano (born October 29, 1971, in Las Palmas de Gran Canaria, Las Palmas) is a retired male diver from Spain, best known for winning the bronze medals at the 1997 European Championships in Seville, Spain and at the World University Games in 1999. He represented his native country in three consecutive Summer Olympics, starting in 1992.  Alvarez also became well known in the United States while competing for the University of Alabama.  He earned the title of "SEC champion" during his career at the University of Alabama.

References

External links
Sports Reference
Train For Success With PADI IDC

1971 births
Living people
Olympic divers of Spain
Spanish male divers
Divers at the 1992 Summer Olympics
Divers at the 1996 Summer Olympics
Divers at the 2000 Summer Olympics
University of Alabama alumni
Universiade medalists in diving
Universiade bronze medalists for Spain
Medalists at the 1999 Summer Universiade
20th-century Spanish people